Ikenaga is a Japanese surname. Notable people with the surname include:

, shiatsu practitioner
, Japanese baseball player
, Japanese shogi player
, Japanese footballer

Japanese-language surnames